Amélie Mauresmo was the defending champion, but withdrew prior to their quarterfinals match against Serena Williams.

Justine Henin won the title, defeating Williams 6–2, 1–6, 7–6(7–5) in the final.

Seeds
The top eight seeds receive a bye into the second round.

Draw

Finals

Top half

Section 1

Section 2

Bottom half

Section 3

Section 4

External links
Main and Qualifying draws

Eurocard German Open - Singles
WTA German Open